The 2015 NCAA Division I softball tournament was held from May 14 through June 3, 2015 as the final part of the 2015 NCAA Division I softball season. The 64 NCAA Division I college softball teams were selected out of an eligible 293 teams on May 10, 2015. Thirty-two teams were awarded an automatic bid as champions of their conference, and thirty-two teams were selected at-large by the NCAA Division I softball selection committee. The tournament culminated with eight teams playing in the 2015 Women's College World Series at ASA Hall of Fame Stadium in Oklahoma City.

Automatic bids
The Big 12, Big West, Mountain West, Pac-12, and West Coast Conference bids were awarded to the regular season champion. All other conferences have the automatic bid go to the conference tournament winner.

National seeds
Teams in italics advanced to super regionals. Teams in bold advanced to Women's College World Series.

1. Florida (50–6)
2.  (46–6)
3. Michigan (51–6)
4. Auburn (49–9)
5.  (44–11)
6. Alabama (42–12)
7.  (45–10)
8.  (42–14)

9.  (45–12)
10.  (39–14)
11.  (45–7)
12.  (38–17)
13. Louisiana–Lafayette (39–9)
14.  (40–14)
15.  (47–8)
16.  (40–13)

Regionals and super regionals
The Regionals took place May 14–17. The Eugene Region was held from May 14 through 16. All other regionals were held from May 15 through 17. The super regionals took place from May 21 through 24.

Gainesville Super Regional

Knoxville Super Regional

Baton Rouge Super Regional

Auburn Super Regional

Ann Arbor Super Regional

Tuscaloosa Super Regional

Los Angeles Super Regional

Eugene Super Regional

Women's College World Series
The Women's College World Series was held May 28 through June 3, 2015, in Oklahoma City.

Participants

Bracket

Championship game

Record by conference

The columns RF, SR, WS, NS, CS, and NC respectively stand for the regional finals, super regionals, College World Series teams, national semifinals, championship series, and national champion.

Media coverage

Radio
Westwood One provided nationwide radio coverage of the championship series. It was streamed online at westwoodsports.com and through TuneIn. Kevin Kugler and Leah Amico provided the call for Westwood One.

Television
ESPN held exclusive rights to the tournament, with games airing across ESPN, ESPN2, and ESPNU. Regional and super-regional games were broadcast additionally using SEC Network, ESPN3, and SEC Network Plus. Longhorn Network simulcast coverage of games involving the Texas Longhorns.

Coverage of the tournament was highly viewed; the LSU/Michigan and UCLA/Auburn games drew the largest viewership of the bracket round games, coverage of game 3 of the championship series was seen by 2.27 million viewers, and all three games in the championship series had an average viewership of 1.85 million. Viewership of the Women's College World Series was 31% higher than that of the 2015 NCAA Division I baseball tournament held later in the month.

Broadcast assignments

Regionals
Ann Arbor: Adam Amin & Amanda Scarborough
Athens: Kaleb Frady & Maya Branch
Auburn: Jennie Ritter & Melissa Lee
Baton Rouge: Beth Mowins, Jessica Mendoza, & Michele Smith
Columbia: Ben Arnet & Ashley Moore
Gainesville: Jonathan Yardley & Jenny Dalton-Hill
Knoxville: Sam Gore & Amanda Freed
Lafayette: Pam Ward & Cheri Kempf
Los Angeles: Holly Rowe & Danielle Lawrie
Norman: Thad Anderson & Carol Bruggeman
Tallahassee: Jonathan Schillace, Karleigh Rafter or Robin Ahrberg
Tuscaloosa: Cara Capuano & Leah Amico

Super regionals
Ann Arbor: Adam Amin & Amanda Scarborough
Knoxville: Sam Gore & Amanda Freed
Auburn: Cara Capuano & Leah Amico
Eugene: Melissa Lee & Jennie Ritter
Tuscaloosa: Beth Mowins, Jessica Mendoza, & Michele Smith
Baton Rouge: Pam Ward & Cheri Kempf
Gainesville: Mark Neely & Jenny Dalton-Hill
Los Angeles: Holly Rowe & Danielle Lawrie
Women's College World Series
Adam Amin, Amanda Scarborough, & Laura Rutledge (afternoons)
Beth Mowins, Jessica Mendoza, Michele Smith, & Holly Rowe (evenings & championship series)
Curt Schilling (championship series)

References

External links
Women's College World Series 2015 official home page
Women's College World Series 2015 official bracket

NCAA Division I softball tournament
Tournament